Amy Lauren Landecker (born September 30, 1969) is an American actress. She is known for her role as Sarah Pfefferman on the Amazon comedy-drama series Transparent (2014–2019), as well as her supporting roles in films Dan in Real Life (2007), A Serious Man (2009), All Is Bright (2013), Project Almanac (2015) and Beatriz at Dinner (2017).

Early life
Landecker was born September 30, 1969, in Chicago, Illinois. She is the daughter of John Records Landecker, a Chicago radio personality. One of her maternal great-grandfathers was lawyer Joseph N. Welch. She attended the University of Wisconsin at Madison, studying theater. Her paternal grandfather was a German Jewish refugee.

Career
Landecker earned her Screen Actors Guild card doing a voiceover for a Tampax commercial. In the commercial, Landecker echoes the voice of the on-camera actress, saying only the word "ballet", but made $10,000 in residuals from the commercial. Landecker recalls, "I never saw money like that in my life, and it didn't even matter what I looked like! I was hooked on [voiceover] from then on!"

Early in her career, Landecker primarily focused on stage work, including but not limited to Rajiv Joseph's All This Intimacy in 2006, and did not move to Los Angeles until she was 38. Since then, she has appeared in numerous films and television shows, including a supporting role as Mrs. Samsky in the Academy Award for Best Picture-nominated film A Serious Man, directed by the Coen brothers. That performance received praise from many film critics, including Roger Ebert, who wrote, "Amy Landecker, too, is perfect as Mrs. Samsky. She makes the character sexy in a strictly logical sense, but any prudent man would know on first sight to stay clear".

In 2011, Landecker was a regular cast member of The Paul Reiser Show on NBC, playing Paul Reiser's wife, Claire. On television, she has guest starred on Law & Order: Special Victims Unit, Law & Order: Criminal Intent, NCIS, Curb Your Enthusiasm (where she met and started to date Larry David), Revenge, and many more series. She has also appeared in a number of Off-Broadway theatrical productions, including Bug. In 2013, Landecker co-starred in films All Is Bright, Clear History and Enough Said. In 2014, she was cast alongside Jeffrey Tambor and Judith Light in the Amazon Studios comedy-drama series, Transparent. She co-starred in the Michael Bay-produced time travel thriller Project Almanac, which was released in January 2015.

Personal life 
Landecker divorced Jackson Lynch, with whom she has a daughter, in 2011. She began dating actor Bradley Whitford, whom she met on the set of Transparent, in 2015. They announced their engagement in March 2018 and married on July 17, 2019.

Filmography

Film

Television

References

External links 
 
 

1969 births
20th-century American actresses
21st-century American actresses
Actresses from Chicago
American film actresses
American people of English descent
American people of German-Jewish descent
American stage actresses
American television actresses
Living people
University of Wisconsin–Madison College of Letters and Science alumni